Kenneth M. Robbins Stadium (formerly Lancer Stadium) is an outdoor multi-purpose stadium in Loyalsock Township, Pennsylvania near Williamsport in North Central Pennsylvania, United States.

The stadium currently is home to the Loyalsock Lancers football boys' and girls' soccer teams. It is owned and operated by the Loyalsock Township School District.

History
Formerly called Lancer Stadium, it was opened in 1971. It has been remodeled multiple times in its history: new bleachers were added in the late 1990s, and turf was added in 2011. The turf was donated after the sports dome in Muncy, Pennsylvania collapsed under large amounts of snow on its roof. Originally designed as indoor turf, it was transplanted to Kenneth M. Robbins Stadium.

In 2017, school board and township members announced plans to replace the turf in 2018. On December 23, 2017 officials announced the new turf work would begin in March 2018 and be complete by August 1, 2018.

Notable events
1979 and 1982: Lycoming Warriors football teams played home games at the stadium 
1999: PIAA state football quarter-finals
2001: PIAA State football semi-finals
2013, 2014, 2015, 2016, 2017: PIAA soccer state semi-finals

See also
 Sports in Pennsylvania
 High school football

References 

Soccer venues in Pennsylvania
Sports venues completed in 1971
1971 establishments in Pennsylvania
Buildings and structures in Lycoming County, Pennsylvania